The National Disaster Risk Reduction and Management Council (NDRRMC), formerly known as the National Disaster Coordinating Council (NDCC), is a working group of various government, non-government, civil sector and private sector organizations of the Government of the Republic of the Philippines established on June 11, 1978 by Presidential Decree 1566. It is administered by the Office of Civil Defense (OCD) under the Department of National Defense (DND). The council is responsible for ensuring the protection and welfare of the people during disasters or emergencies.
The NDRRMC plans and leads the guiding activities in the field of communication, warning signals, emergency, transportation, evacuation, rescue, engineering, health and rehabilitation, public education and auxiliary services such as fire fighting and the police in the country.
The Council utilizes the UN Cluster Approach in disaster management. It is the country's focal for the ASEAN Agreement on Disaster Management and Emergency Response (AADMER) and many other related international commitments.

Council membership
On May 27, 2010, during the administration of Gloria Macapagal-Arroyo, the Philippine Disaster Risk Reduction and Management Act of 2010 (RA 10121) was signed into law. Five months later on October 2010 during the Benigno Aquino III administration, the National Disaster Coordinating Council (NDCC) was renamed into National Disaster Risk Reduction and Management Council (NDRRMC). The following heads of agencies compose the NDRRMC:

As of June 30, 2022, these are the following members of the council:

Local DRRM Offices
According of Republic Act 10121, various local governments throughout the country should establish Local DRRM Offices at the regional, provincial, municipal, city and barangay levels. As functional arms of the local governments, these Offices are responsible to create a Local Disaster Risk Reduction and Management Plan according to the Framework of the NDRRMC covering 4 aspects including disaster preparedness, response, prevention and mitigation, and rehabilitation and recovery.
 
Local Offices usually have a Chief DRRM Officer supported by Administrative and Training, Research and Planning, Operations and Warning Officers. Some of these Offices have advanced to organizing their own search and rescue and emergency medical services squads and command-control-and-communications centers.

Disaster response

Typhoon Haiyan (Yolanda)

The NDRRMC was in charge of gathering and reporting data in the wake of Typhoon Haiyan. On November 15, 2014, the agency reported 5,632 deaths, 1,140 people missing and 12,166 injured. The agency has reported the rose of death toll to 6,190 deaths, 1,785 missing and 28, 626 injured. They also estimated that the typhoon cost  damage to the infrastructure and agriculture of the Visayan Region. As of April 17, 2015, the National Disaster Risk Reduction and Management Council confirmed  total of 6,300 deaths including 5,877 of those taking place in the Eastern Visayas.

Mount Pinatubo Eruption
When the population was put into a state of alert during the first phases of the Pinatubo crisis, authorities from the NDCC showed indisputable efficiency in managing the people.

Precautionary Measures Before Sensing an Eruption 
Prior the eruption, no precautionary measures were taken until signs of activity were observed in 1991. This could be attributed to the absence of any oral or written records of volcanic activity for the past 400 years in the surrounding areas.

Precautionary Measures After Sensing an Eruption 
By April 3, 1991, PHIVOLCS, after having concluded that the volcano was reawakening, decided to evacuate Aetas villages that were lying within a radius of 10 km around the summit. On May 13, 1991, a 5-level warning and evacuation system was constituted. This system included a concentric danger zone surrounding the volcano, continuously fixing four radii of evacuation from 10 to 40 kilometers between June 7 and 18, which mostly depended on the evolution of the threat. On the day of June 26, 1991, orders of evacuation were conveyed to local authorities or Coordination Councils (DCC). During those times, the entire zone located within the 10 km radius around the crater of Pinatubo has been decreed as permanent high risk sector by PHIVOLCS prohibiting all human occupation of the zone.

In the time of Pinatubo’s eruptive phase in June 1991, most of the population reacted favorably to the evacuation orders due to the early preparation and coordination efforts the authorities on the field have demonstrated. However, there were still some Aetas that changed their minds and decided to return to the mountains seeking refuge in caves and spiritual comfort from their God. There were also others that refused to leave, having been convinced that the expected eruption would not be extreme enough to reach their homes, and having been scared at the thought of having to abandon their belongings and crops. By the time the second warning was given out in July 1992, the population, having been more aware of previous events, were much more prepared. Despite the PHIVOLCS frequent pleas and the population's positive response to it though, a total of 300 Aetas families still refused to evacuate.

Post-disaster Recovery
Under the DRRM Act, the National Economic and Development Authority (NEDA) is designated as the lead agency for the recovery. NEDA is mandated to coordinate the recovery support functions of national government agencies, local governments, and civil society organizations (CSOs). However, during the recovery from Typhoon Haiyan, NDRRMC was caught unprepared due to the typhoon's overwhelming impacts. It was in this context that the government, through the President's Memorandum Order 62 of December 2013, created the Office of the Presidential Assistant for Rehabilitation and Recovery (OPARR) to focus exclusively on coordinating the recovery process. OPARR aims to unify efforts of the government and other institutions involved in recovery. It has special power to mobilize the full resources of the country and to expedite the decision-making process under the direct authority of the President. OPARR was dissolved after two years.

See also
 Office of Civil Defense (Philippines)

References

External links
NDRRMC official website

Department of National Defense (Philippines)
Organizations established in 1970
Emergency services in the Philippines
Establishments by Philippine presidential decree